is a Japanese manga series written and illustrated by Yoshikazu Yasuhiko, published in Tokuma Shoten's Monthly Comic Ryū from March 1979 to September 1984. The story follows Arion, a young man kidnapped by Hades as a child and raised to believe that his mother was blinded by Zeus and that killing the ruler of Mount Olympus will cure her.

An animated feature film adaptation, written and directed by Yoshikazu Yasuhiko, was released in 1986.

Cast
 Shigeru Nakahara - Arion
 Miki Takahashi - Resphoina
 Mayumi Tanaka - Seneca
 Hirotaka Suzuoki - Apollo
 Masako Katsuki - Athena
 Chikao Ōtsuka - Hades
 Kiyoshi Kobayashi - Poseidon
 Masanobu Ōkubo - Zeus
 Ichirō Nagai - Lycaon
 Reiko Mutō - Demeter
 Hideyuki Tanaka - Prometheus
 Kazue Komiya - Arion (young)
 Ryōko Kinomiya - Gaia
 Toku Nishio - Gid
 Daisuke Gōri - Heracles
 Bin Shimada - Ares
 Takako Ōta - Pio
 Kōhei Miyauchi - Ethos
 Hisako Kyōda - Ethos' Wife
 Tomomichi Nishimura - Priest

References

External links
 
 

1979 manga
1986 anime films
Animated films based on manga
Discotek Media
Fantasy anime and manga
Classical mythology in anime and manga
Japanese animated films
Seinen manga
Sunrise (company)
Tokuma Shoten manga